German submarine U-138 was a Type IID U-boat of Nazi Germany's Kriegsmarine in World War II. Her keel was laid down on 16 November 1939 by Deutsche Werke in Kiel as yard number 267. She was launched on 18 May 1940 and commissioned on 27 June 1940 with Oberleutnant zur See Wolfgang Lüth in command.

She was scuttled on 18 June 1941 after being damaged by British warships west of Cadiz in Spain. There were no casualties from her crew of 28.

Design
German Type IID submarines were enlarged versions of the original Type IIs. U-138 had a displacement of  when at the surface and  while submerged. She had two shafts and two  propellers.

U-138 was fitted with three  torpedo tubes at the bow, five torpedoes or up to twelve Type A torpedo mines, and a  anti-aircraft gun. The boat had a complement of 25.

Operational career

First patrol
U-138 departed Kiel on her first patrol on 10 September 1940. Her route took her through the Kattegat and Skagerrak before entering the North Sea. She then reached her area of operations off western Scotland and northern Northern Ireland after negotiating the gap between the Faroe and Shetland Islands.

Her first victim was New Sevilla, quickly followed by Boka and City of Simla. The following day, she hit Empire Adventure.

The boat docked in Lorient on the French Atlantic coast on 26 September.

Second patrol
For her second foray, U-138 sank Bonheur and damaged British Glory on 15 October 1940 northwest of the Butt of Lewis in the Outer Hebrides. British Glory was repaired and returned to service in January 1942.

Third patrol
Patrol number three involved another passage west of the British Isles so that the submarine could safely dock in Kiel, but she did not add to her score.

Fourth patrol
The boat returned to Lorient on 27 May 1941, having sunk Javanese Prince on the 20th.

Fifth patrol
The resulting damage forced the crew to abandon ship and scuttle the U-boat. There were no casualties amongst her crew of 28, who were taken prisoner-of-war and brought to Gibraltar.

Summary of raiding history

References

Bibliography

External links

German Type II submarines
Ships built in Kiel
Shipwrecks of Spain
U-boats commissioned in 1940
U-boats scuttled in 1941
World War II submarines of Germany
World War II shipwrecks in the Atlantic Ocean
Maritime incidents in June 1941